Never, Never, Land is the second album by the British electronic music act UNKLE, released on 22 September 2003. On 24 October 2004 an expanded edition entitled Never, Never, Land Revisited was released. The original album debuted at No. 71 in Australia. It was promoted by four singles: "Eye for an Eye", "In a State", "Reign" and "Safe in Mind", which was released only as a 12" promo.

The tracks on the album contain audio samples from the movies The Prophecy, Jacob's Ladder, THX 1138 and The Thin Red Line. "Panic Attack" samples the beat from "She's Lost Control" and "Inside" samples the beat from "New Dawn Fades", both original songs by English post-punk band Joy Division.

Track listing
 "Back and Forth" – 0:54
 "Eye for an Eye" – 5:45
 "In a State" – 6:59
 "Safe in Mind (Please Get This Gun From Out My Face)" (featuring Josh Homme) – 6:21
 "I Need Something Stronger" (featuring Brian Eno & Jarvis Cocker) – 4:16
 "What Are You to Me?" – 6:45
 "Panic Attack" – 5:13
 "Invasion" (featuring 3D) – 5:15
 "Reign" (featuring Ian Brown and Mani) – 5:32
 "Glow" (featuring Joel Cadbury of South) – 4:19
 "Inside"– 8:20
 "Awake the Unkind"  – 4:35
 "Eye for an Eye Backwards" (Josh Homme & Alain Johannes Remix)  – 6:23
 "Safe in Mind (Please Get This Gun From Out My Face)" (Chris Goss Remix)  – 4:45

Disc two of Never, Never, Land Revisited: Inside Out
"Blackout" – 6:50
"Tracier" – 2:09
"Panic Attack" (Ape Sounds Remix) – 6:08
"Reign" (Anagram - Psychonauts Remix) – 9:44
"In a State" (DFA Remix) – 11:59
"Invasion" (Medway Vs Eva Coast to Coast Remix) – 8:41
"Have You Passed through This Night?"  – 9:35
"Glow" (Hybrid Remix) – 7:58
"In a State" (Sasha Remix) – 11:04

Miscellaneous
Some CD versions of the album feature a hidden track in the pregap. The track can be heard by playing the beginning of track one and then using the rewind/search button to go back 0:18.

The track "Glow" was used as one of the insert songs of the 2009 film Push starring Dakota Fanning.

Samples

"Back and Forth"
The narrator/voice of the first track is Street poet Robert Alan Weiser.
Black Sabbath - "Changes" (only appears in early leaked versions of the album, but readily available on public websites, e.g. YouTube)
"Eye for an Eye"
The film The Prophecy (vocal sample: "Even now in heaven there were angels carrying savage weapons")
James Asher- "Fairground Ghost" 
The Undisputed Truth – "Ball of Confusion"
The film The Thin Red Line (vocal samples: "Does it help the grass to grow? The sun to shine?", "Is this darkness in you too? Have you passed through this night?", "This great evil. Where's it come from?")
"Safe in Mind"
The film Fallen (vocal sample: "I like the night. The street. The smells. The sense of another world. Sometimes you come face to face with yourself.")
"I Need Something Stronger"
William Blake's Introduction, from Songs of Innocence and of Experience (poem, 1795)
The film THX 1138 (vocal sample: "what's wrong?" Nothing, really. I just, you know, i need something stronger", "Can you feel this? What is that buzzin'")
The film Jacob's Ladder (vocal sample: "It's just a matter of how you look at it, that's all")
"Panic Attack"
Joy Division - "She's Lost Control" 
Richard Pinhas - "Variation III Sur Le Theme De Bene Gesserit"
"Reign"
"Scott Walker" - "Farmer in the City (Remembering Pasolini)"
"Inside"
The film Jacob's Ladder (vocal sample: "The only thing that burns in hell is the part of you that won't let go of your life…")
Joy Division - "New Dawn Fades"
"Blackout"
Hawkwind - "Motorhead"

Charts

References

2003 albums
Unkle albums
Mo' Wax albums